Studio A is an Australian television series which aired from 1963 to 1964 on what would eventually become the Seven Network. A variety series, hosts during the run of the series included the Le Garde twins, Terry O'Neill, and Stuart Wagstaff. It featured music and comedy.

References

External links
Studio A on IMDb

1963 Australian television series debuts
1964 Australian television series endings
Black-and-white Australian television shows
English-language television shows
Australian variety television shows
Seven Network original programming